Aspidosperma spruceanum is a species of flowering plant in the genus Aspidosperma. It is native to Brazil, Bolivia, Peru, and the Guianas.

References

External links
 Aspidosperma spruceanum Plants of Nicaragua

spruceanum
Plants described in 1860
Trees of Peru
Trees of Brazil
Trees of Bolivia
Trees of Ecuador
Trees of Panama
Trees of Costa Rica
Trees of Venezuela
Trees of Colombia
Trees of Mexico
Trees of Guatemala
Trees of Belize
Trees of French Guiana